Batrachedra epimyxa is a moth in the family Batrachedridae. It is found in India.

References

Natural History Museum Lepidoptera generic names catalog

Batrachedridae
Moths described in 1916